Gwyn Hughes (born 26 March 1941) is a former Welsh cricketer.  Hughes was a right-handed batsman who bowled slow left-arm orthodox.  He was born at Cardiff, Glamorgan, and attended Cardiff High School.

Hughes made his first-class debut for Glamorgan against the touring Pakistanis in 1962.  He made sixteen further first-class appearances for the county, the last of which came against Yorkshire in the 1964 County Championship.  In seventeen first-class matches for Glamorgan, Hughes scored 228 runs at an average of 12.66, with a highest score of 92 against the touring Australians in 1964.  With the ball, he took 12 wickets at a bowling average of 46.66, with best figures of 3/20.

While studying at Queens' College, Cambridge, Hughes played for Cambridge University Cricket Club in 1965 and gained his cricket blue, the varsity match being his final first-class appearance. In ten matches for Cambridge he scored 229 runs at an average of 12.05, with a high score of 48, and took 19 wickets at an average of 42.52, with career best figures of 4/31. A good rugby player, he represented the university.

In later life Hughes taught economics at St Paul's School, London. Hughes presided over the notorious unbeaten 1st XI in the Summer of 2000 during his penultimate year as Master in Charge of cricket at the school.

References

External links
Gwyn Hughes at ESPNcricinfo
Gwyn Hughes at CricketArchive

1941 births
Living people
Cricketers from Cardiff
Alumni of the University of Cambridge
Welsh cricketers
Glamorgan cricketers
Cambridge University cricketers
Welsh educators
Alumni of Queens' College, Cambridge